Erin Lum (born 2 February 1977) is a judoka from Guam. She competed in the women's middleweight event at the 1992 Summer Olympics.

References

External links
 

1977 births
Living people
Guamanian female judoka
Olympic judoka of Guam
Judoka at the 1992 Summer Olympics
Place of birth missing (living people)
21st-century American women